Randolph W. Peterson (born September 11, 1953) was an American attorney, politician, and jurist.

Early life and education 
Peterson was born in Minneapolis and graduated from the Forest Lake Area High School in Forest Lake, Minnesota. He received a Bachelor of Arts degree in political science from the University of Minnesota in 1976 and his Juris Doctor degree from the University of Minnesota Law School in 1979.

Career 
After graduating from law school, he was admitted to the Minnesota State Bar Association. Peterson served in the Minnesota Senate from 1981 to 1990 and was a Democrat. In 1990, Peterson was appointed to the Minnesota Court of Appeals. He left the court in 2018 and was succeeded by Jeanne Cochran.

Personal life 
Peterson lived in Wyoming, Minnesota, with his wife and family.

References

1953 births
Living people
People from Chisago County, Minnesota
University of Minnesota alumni
University of Minnesota Law School alumni
Minnesota lawyers
Minnesota Court of Appeals judges
Democratic Party Minnesota state senators